Moraskhun, also rendered as Moraz Khan or Muraz Khan, may refer to:
 Moraskhun-e Olya
 Moraskhun-e Sofla